The Constitution Building is an eleven-story office building in Ottawa, Ontario, Canada.

Located at 305 Rideau Street at the corner of King Edward, the building was used by the Department of National Defence (DND). As of 2015, the building has been decommissioned and all sections of DND have been relocated.

Amenities at the building included a cafeteria, barber shop and convenience store, all of which were accessible to the general public as well as employees of the building.

The building was constructed in 1963 by the Bourque brothers and originally named the Bourque Memorial Building, in honour of their father and former Mayor of Ottawa Eddy Bourque.

After significant renovations, the Constitution Building is, as of 2020, an all-inclusive student apartment building branded under the name Théo.

References

Federal government buildings in Ottawa